Winding Rivers Library System (WRLS) is the public library system involving 7 counties in Wisconsin: Buffalo, Jackson, Juneau, La Crosse, Monroe, Trempealeau, and Vernon Counties. The La Crosse Public Library is the resource library for WRLS and the administrative offices are in West Salem, Wisconsin.

External links

La Crosse, Wisconsin
Public libraries in Wisconsin
Education in La Crosse County, Wisconsin
Education in Buffalo County, Wisconsin
Education in Jackson County, Wisconsin
Education in Juneau County, Wisconsin
Education in Monroe County, Wisconsin
Education in Trempealeau County, Wisconsin
Education in Vernon County, Wisconsin